Sears and Dwight defeated Nightingale and Smith in the final of the second U.S. doubles championship.

Draw

References 
 

Men's Doubles
U.S. National Championships (tennis) by year – Men's doubles